Constance Dima (Greek: Κωνστάνς Δημά), born Konstantina Karadimou (Κωνσταντίνα Καραδήμου) August 18, 1948, is a Greek writer, poet and translator.

Biographical note 
Constance Dima was born in Greece during the civil war (1946-1949) in the mountain of the Grammos in the region of Kastoria. She spent her childhood and teenage years in former Czechoslovakia. She studied tourism management, French and Bulgarian Philology and completed post graduate studies in French language tutoring. Polyglot, speaking six languages, she worked as a guide, translator and mainly as a teacher of French in Bulgaria and Greece. She finished her career as a French teacher in Belgium working with the third-generation children of Greek immigrants in Brussels and with the children of Greek citizens working for the institutions of the European Community. Since the summer of 2009 she has been living in Greece near Heraklion on the island of Crete. For more information about the author, see: Homepage of Constance Dima in External links.

Works 

 Stories

Foteini exodos (Φωτεινή έξοδος = Bright way aut) (Greek version), Heraklion (Crete- Greece): [DVD-ROM], 2020. 
Foteini exodos (Φωτεινή έξοδος = Bright way aut) (Greek version), Heraklion (Crete- Greece): [e-book], 2020. 
Le salut de la lumière (Bright way aut) (French version), Paris : Saint Honoré Publishers, 2019. 

 Novel

To kyanokhroma tis monaxias (Το κυανόχρωμα της μοναξιάς = Solitude is azure) (Greek version), Thessaloniki : Saixpirikon Publishers, 2015. 
La solitude a la couleur de l’azur = Solitude is azure (French version), Aix-en-Provence : Editions Persé, 2011. 

Poetry collections

Afieroseis – Dédicaces :  publication bilingue grec et français = Dedications: bilingual poetry collection  in Greek and French, Athens: Fildisi editions, winter 2021. 
Asphyxie CD-ROM: recueil de poésie en quatre langues = Asfyxie CD-ROM: poetry collection in four languages, Athens: [s.n.], 2008.  (CD-ROM)
Skia kai fos : Poiimata 1993–95 (Σκιά και φως: Ποιήματα 1993–95) – Ombre et lumière: Poèmes 1993–95  = Shadow and Light: Poems 1993–95, Xanthi (Greece): [s.n.], 1995
Apohrossis ton oniron (Αποχρώσεις των ονείρων = Shades of Dreams),  Xanthi: [s.n.], 1993
Imo Pectore, Xanthi: [s.n.], 1990
 
Essay
  
Les formes de l'amour dans l'œuvre de Jean-Claude Villain = The forms of love in the work of Jean-Claude Villain. Thessaloniki: Kornilia Sfakianaki Publishers & University of Thessaloniki, 2006. 

Testimony
  
Les petits princes de l'univers = The Little Princes of the Universe (French version). Paris: L'Harmattan Publisher, 2002. 
I mikri prighipes tou sympantos (Οι μικροί πρίγκιπες του σύμπαντος = The Little Princes of the Universe) (Greek version). Athens : Hestia Publishers, 1998. 
Teaching
Dima, Constance . Gallika gia enilikes (Γαλλικά για ενήλικες =  French for adults). Teaching Method.  Heraklion (Crete- Greece): [DVD-ROM], 2021. 

 Works in collaboration with students of French

Album
   
Invitation à un voyage captivant: Ecole Hellénique de Bruxelles 2006–2009 = Invitation to a captivating voyage: Greek Gymnasium Lyceum of Brussels 2006–2009. Greek Gymnasium Lyceum of Brussels: Large-scale production CD-ROMs, 2009.
Les coins lumineux d’Athènes: Ecole Expérimentale de Varvakeio 2002–2004 = Bright Spots in Athens: Varvakeio Experimental School 2002–2004. Athens: The Association of French Teachers: Large-scale production CD-ROMs, 2005.

Translations 

Poetry collections

from Greek into French
Yfantis, Yannis. Temple du monde = Temple of the World [tr.by]: Constance Dima & Jean-Claude Villain. Paris : L’Harmattan, 2003. . Original title: Ναός του κόσμου = Naos tou Kosmou
Théodorou, Victoria. Poèmes choisis = Selected works [tr.by]: Constance Dima & Jean-Claude Villain.Paris: L’Harmattan, 2001. . Original title: Selected works

from French into Greek 
Villain, Jean-Claude. Ο taphos ton vassileon  (O τάφος των βασιλέων = The Fall of Kings) = [tr.by]: Constance Dima. Copyright: Digital Library: eBooks4Greeks, 2019. Original title: Le tombeau des rois
Dannemark, Francis. Poèmes choisis = Selected works [tr.by]: Constance Dima. Copyright: Digital Library: eBooks4Greeks, 2021

Theatre

from French into Greek 
Villain, Jean-Claude. Labrys (Λάβρυς = Labrys) [tr.by]: Constance Dima. Copyright: Digital Library: eBooks4Greeks, 2019

Essays

from French into Greek
Villain, Jean-Claude. Οι θυσιασμένοι : Μυθοπλαστικά δοκίμια για την κατανόηση των μύθων: Ο ταύρος, ο Βαν Γκογκ και ο Δον Ζουάν (I thisiasmeni : Mithoplastika dokimia ia tin katanoisi ton mython : o tauros, o Van Gogh kai o Don Chuan) [tr.by]: Constance Dima. Athens: Anemodeiktis, 2005. . Original title: Essais de compréhension mythologique (Les sacrifiés) = Essays of mythological comprehension (The sacrificed)

Scenario

from Czech into Greek
Fthinoporini epistrofi (Φθινοπωρινή επιστροφή = Autumn Return) [tr.by]: Constance Dima. Copyright: The National Library of Greece, Athens: 5.1.2000. Original title: Podzimní návrat
from Czech into French
Retour d’automne = Autumn Return. [tr.by]: Constance Dima & Jean-Claude Villain. Copyright: The National Library of Greece, Athens: November 18, 1999. Original title: Podzimní návrat

Album

French – Greek – English – German
Les coins lumineux d’Athènes – Φωτεινές γωνιές της Αθήνας – Bright Spots in Athens – Strahlende Winkel in Athen [tr.by]: The students of the Varvakeio Experimental School in collaboration with theirs professors Konstantina Karadimou, Nitsopoulou, Vekios & Laiou. Athens: IONPRESS, 2005

Participations 

in the 22nd World Congress of Poets hοld in Larissa (Greece) from June 29th to July 3rd, 2011 with the Lecture “World Brotherhood and Peace through Poetry”
Amorgos guide, Athens 2010 – translation from Greek into French, web site:  
in the script for the feature film “Autumn Return” (Podzimní návrat) by George Agathonikiadis. Czech Television Brno Studio & Greek TV ET1 Athens, 2001
Constance Dima speaks in the documentary of George Agathonikiadis dedicated to Greek children from Czech Republic. Czech Television Brno Studio, 2000: “The Greek children” (Řecké děti), & Greek TV ET1 Athens, 2000: “The trains that left” (Ta trena pou fygan), 2001

Awards 

2nd Prize for Poetry in the Writing Competition 'Francophonie 1999''', Athens (Greece), March 20, 1999
 2nd Prize for comparative linguistics in the 11th Young People's Competition for Scientific and Technical Creation'', Sofia University "Kliment Ohridski", Sofia (Bulgaria), 1979

External links 

Homepage of Constance Dima (in English, Greek, French, Spanish, Italian, Czech, Bulgarian and Russian) 
Constance Dima  in websites of  EKEVI [3]
http://www.ekebi.gr/frontoffice/portal.asp?cpage=NODE&cnode=462&t=4014
http://www.ekebi.gr/frontoffice/portal.asp?cpage=NODE&cnode=470&cuser=====$curuser$&page=10&author=167&act=Search
 Konstans Dima in iDNES.cz 18.března 2009 [4]
http://zpravy.idnes.cz/recka-holcicka-konstans-dima-nema-na-brno-nejlepsi-vzpominky-pr9-/brno.asp?c=A090316_143846_brno_taj
 Constance Dima in Stachtes Hellenic Review, 2009 (24): Grec translation of the Czech article [5]
http://www.constance-dima.com/wp-content/uploads/2019/09/t24_summer2009.pdf
Constance Dima in BiblioNet [6]
http://www.biblionet.gr/main.asp?page=results&person_id=4514&person=x
http://www.biblionet.gr/author/4514/Constance_Dima
Constance Dima in Stachtes Hellenic Review [7]
French-speaking Belgian poets — presentation-translation: Constance Dima

Part 1: Jan. 31, Part 2: Feb. 7, Part 3: Feb. 14, Part 4: Feb. 21, 2019

https://staxtes2003.com/2019/01/31/31-1-19/
https://staxtes2003.com/2019/02/07/7-2-19-2/
https://staxtes2003.com/2019/02/14/14-2-19/
https://staxtes2003.com/2019/02/21/21-2-19/
Bright way aut  of Constance Dima e-book (URL)  [8]
http://www.constance-dima.com/?p=2068

1948 births
Living people
Greek women poets
Greek women writers
Modern Greek poets
Greek translators
20th-century Greek poets
20th-century Greek women writers